Admiral John Moore Casement CB (13 September 1877 – 25 January 1952) was a Royal Navy officer who commanded the 3rd Battle Squadron.

Naval career
Educated at Fettes College and Britannia Royal Naval College, Casement joined the Royal Navy in 1891. He served in World War I as commanding officer of the cruiser  and saw action at the Battle of Jutland in 1916. He went on to become commanding officer of the cruiser HMS Comus in 1916.

After the War Casement became commanding officer of the battlecruiser HMS Courageous in 1921, commanding officer of the battleship HMS Benbow in 1924, and received flag rank as rear admiral on 4 October 1926. He was then appointed Commander of 3rd Battle Squadron in 1929 before retiring in 1931.

References

1877 births
1952 deaths
Companions of the Order of the Bath
Royal Navy admirals
People educated at Fettes College